La Garceana is a corregimiento in Montijo District, Veraguas Province, Panama with a population of 276 as of 2010. Its population as of 1990 was 382; its population as of 2000 was 263.

References

Corregimientos of Veraguas Province